Abhishek Sharma (born 10 August 1985) is an Indian cricketer. He is a Right arm leg spin bowler who hits powerful shots as a lower order batsman.

See also

 2002 ICC Under-19 Cricket World Cup 
 2004 ICC Under-19 Cricket World Cup

References

External links
Cricinfo profile
CricketArchive

1985 births
Living people
Indian cricketers
Delhi cricketers
Delhi Giants cricketers